Irun is a town of the Bidasoaldea region in the province of Gipuzkoa in the Basque Autonomous Community, Spain.

History 
It lies on the foundations of the ancient Oiasso, cited as a Roman-Vasconic town.

During the Spanish Civil War, the city was site of the 1936 Battle of Irun, which ended with a strategic victory for the Nationalist forces.

Location and transport
One of the biggest towns in Gipuzkoa, its location on the border between Spain and France, across the Bidasoa river from Hendaye), has made Irun into a commercial and logistic centre. Irun railway station is a major break-of-gauge where the SNCF  rails meet the  broad gauge Renfe ones.

Currently Irun has a fairground with a modern exhibition and telecommunication facilities, just some 100 metres away from the actual border at the Santiago Bridge (river Bidasoa).

Irun is part of the conurbation of Txingudi bay with Hondarribia and Hendaye; the town is also within the area of the Eurocité Basque Bayonne-San Sebastián, a European economic interest grouping. (fr)

Culture and tourism
One of its main festivals is the Alarde de San Marcial, a parade recreating an episode of the Peninsular War, held every year on 30 June.

There are hot mineral springs in the town.

Sport
The town is home to one of Europe's top handball team CD Bidasoa, who play at the Pabellón Polideportivo Artaleku.

Its football club is Real Unión who play in the third tier, and are based at Stadium Gal.

Climate
Irun has an oceanic climate courtesy of strong maritime moderation from the Bay of Biscay. Rainfall is frequent year-round since Irun is on the windward side of the Pyrenees. Rain often falls in high quantities on individual days with  falling on just 138 days.

People from Irun

 Manuel Anatol (8 May 1903 – 17 May 1990) was a naturalized French professional football player.
 Ramón Iribarren (1900 - 1967), Engineer who made notable contributions in the field of coastal engineering. 
 Tirso de Olazábal y Lardizábal (1842–1921), Carlist politician
 Juan Olazábal Ramery (1860–1937), Carlist politician
 Luis Mariano, singer.
 Amaia Montero, singer.
 Fermin Muguruza, singer.
 Alberto Górriz, footballer.
 Alberto López Fernández, footballer.
 Iñaki Descarga, footballer.
 Javier Garrido, footballer.
 Javier Irureta, footballer.
 Javier Yubero, footballer.
 Luis Regueiro, footballer.
 Patricio Arabolaza, footballer.
 Oier Olazábal, footballer.
 Sergio Francisco, footballer.
 Juan Manuel Gárate, cyclist.
 Basilio Sánchez Beguiristáin, mayor of the Chilean commune of Pichilemu.
 Kortatu, punkrock band
 Menchu Gal, painter
 , reporter
Leontxo García, chess player & commentator for the El País newspaper

References

External links
Irun municipal government website 
 Lakaxita gaztetxea

 
Vascones